The Houston Light Guard was one of the oldest militia companies founded in Texas. Founded in 1873, it served as Company G of the 143rd Infantry Regiment during both World Wars.

References

Military units and formations in Texas
Companies of the United States Army National Guard
Military units and formations established in 1873